Art Angel is a Philippine television informative show broadcast by GMA Network. Originally hosted by Pia Arcangel,  Tonipet Gaba and Krystal Reyes. It premiered on April 17, 2004. In 2010, Arcangel and Reyes left the show and were replaced by Roxanne Barcelo on June 19, 2010. The show concluded on May 14, 2011 with a total of 370 episodes. It was replaced by Sabadabadog! in its timeslot.

Accolades

References

External links
 

2004 Philippine television series debuts
2011 Philippine television series endings
Angels in television
Filipino-language television shows
GMA Network original programming
GMA Integrated News and Public Affairs shows
Philippine children's television series
Television series about art